Jeremiah Denton Airport , formerly Dauphin Island Airport, is a county-owned public-use airport in Mobile County, Alabama, United States. It is just northwest of the central business district of Dauphin Island, a town located on a barrier island. The airport is on Mobile Bay, west of the Aloe Bay Channel.

This airport is included in the FAA's National Plan of Integrated Airport Systems for 2011–2015 and 2009–2013, both of which categorized it as a general aviation facility. In 2017 the airfield was closed for a time to test Navy drone operations.

Facilities and aircraft 
Dauphin Island Airport covers an area of 22 acres (9 ha) at an elevation of 5 feet (2 m) above mean sea level. It has one runway designated 12/30 with an asphalt surface measuring 3,000 by 80 feet (914 x 24 m). For the 12-month period ending May 18, 2010, the airport had 3,650 general aviation aircraft operations, an average of 10 per day.

References

External links 
 Aerial image as of 15 February 1997 from USGS The National Map
 Birding areas at Dauphin Island Airport
 

Airports in Mobile County, Alabama